Hellings Frank "Gabadinho" Mhango (born 27 September 1992) is a Malawian professional footballer who plays for South African club AmaZulu and the Malawi national team, as a striker.

Club career
Mhango has played club football for Brave Warriors, Big Bullets, Bloemfontein Celtic, Lamontville Golden Arrows and Bidvest Wits.

In June 2019, he signed for Orlando Pirates.

He moved to AmaZulu in June 2022.

International career
He made his international debut for Malawi in 2012. In September 2012, Mhango was called to the Malawi squad for the forthcoming Africa Cup of Nations qualifying match against Ghana. In May 2013, it was announced that he would be unavailable for two forthcoming World Cup qualifying matches due to his school exams. Mhango scored twice in Malawi's first 2015 Africa Cup of Nations qualifying match against Chad on 17 May 2014.

Mhango's goal during the 2021 African Cup of Nations against Morocco made it to the top three of CAF Awards for the goal of the tournament.

International goals
As of match played 25 January 2022. Malawi score listed first, score column indicates score after each Mhango goal.

References

1992 births
Living people
Malawian footballers
Malawi international footballers
Nyasa Big Bullets FC players
Bloemfontein Celtic F.C. players
Lamontville Golden Arrows F.C. players
Bidvest Wits F.C. players
Association football forwards
Malawian expatriate footballers
Malawian expatriate sportspeople in South Africa
Expatriate soccer players in South Africa
Orlando Pirates F.C. players
2021 Africa Cup of Nations players
AmaZulu F.C. players